Katalin Juhász (born Juhász Katalin; born 24 November 1932 in Hódmezővásárhely) was a Hungarian foil fencer.

From 1947, she was the fencer of Szegedi Postás, from 1950 the fencer of Szegedi Haladás, from 1957 she played in OSC (Orvosegyetemi Sport Club, Sport Club of the University of Medicine). From 1957 to 1967, she was a member of the Olympic team of Hungary. During her career, she won two Olympic and seven world championship medals. She stopped active sport in 1967.

In 1956, she graduated with a diploma in Chemistry from the University of Szeged. After leaving sport, she became a development engineer of the Accumulator Factory (Akkumulátorgyár) in Budapest. She is retired from 1987.

Results

 Olympic champion:
 1964, Tokyo: foil team (Judit Ágoston, Lídia Dömölky, Paula Marosi, Ildikó Rejtő)
 Olympics, 2nd place:
 1960, Rome: foil team (Lídia Dömölky, Magda Nyári, Ildikó Rejtő, Györgyi Marvalits)
 Olympics, 5th place:
 1964, Tokyo: foil individual
 World champion:
 1959, Budapest: foil team (Dömölky Lídia, Zsuzsa Morvay, Magda Nyári, Ildikó Rejtő, Györgyi Marvalits)
 1962, Buenos Aires: foil team (Mária Gulácsy, Paula Marosi, Magda Nyári, Ildikó Rejtő)
 1967, Montreal: foil team (Ildikó Bóbis, Lídia Dömölky, Mária Gulácsy, Ildikó Rejtő)
 Second place on world championships:
 1961, Torino: foil team (Judit Ágoston, Lídia Dömölky, Magda Nyári, Ildikó Rejtő, Györgyi Marvalits)
 1963, Gdańsk: foil team (Lídia Dömölky, Paula Marosi, Magda Nyári, Ildikó Rejtő, Katalin Szalontay)
 Third place on world championships:
 1962, Buenos Aires: foil individual
 1963, Gdańsk: foil individual
  Fourth place on world championships:
 1958, Philadelphia: foil team (Lídia Dömölky, Magda Nyári, Ildikó Rejtő)
 Fifth place on world championships:
 1959, Budapest: foil individual
 Sixth place on world championships:
 1961, Torino: foil individual
 Winner of the Universiade:
 1957, Paris: foil team (Judit Ágoston, Vera Kelemen, Zsuzsa Morvay)
 Second place on the Universiade:
 1957, Paris: foil individual

References

Sources
 László Havas: A magyar sport aranykönyve – Budapest, 1982 – 
 Endre Kahlich – László Gy. Papp – Zoltán Subert: Olimpiai játékok 1896–1976 – Budapest, 1977 – 
 Révai új lexikona X. (Hom–Kac). Editor István Tarsoly. Szekszárd: Babits. 2002. 
 Miklós Bocsák: Hogyan élnek olimpiai bajnokaink (166-an szerte a világban) – St. plusz kft., 1998 – (without ISBN number)
 László Lukács – György Szepesi: 112. A magyar olimpiai aranyérmek története – Budapest, 1980 – 

1932 births
Living people
Hungarian female foil fencers
Olympic fencers of Hungary
Fencers at the 1960 Summer Olympics
Fencers at the 1964 Summer Olympics
Olympic gold medalists for Hungary
Olympic silver medalists for Hungary
Olympic medalists in fencing
University of Szeged alumni
People from Hódmezővásárhely
Medalists at the 1960 Summer Olympics
Medalists at the 1964 Summer Olympics
Sportspeople from Csongrád-Csanád County
20th-century Hungarian women